Cleveite is an impure radioactive variety of uraninite containing uranium, found in Norway. It has the composition UO2 with about 10% of the uranium substituted by rare-earth elements. It was named after Swedish chemist Per Teodor Cleve.

Cleveite was the first known terrestrial source of helium, which is created over time by alpha decay of the uranium and accumulates trapped (occluded) within the mineral. The first sample of helium was obtained by William Ramsay in 1895 when he treated a sample of the mineral with acid. Cleve and Abraham Langlet succeeded in isolating helium from cleveite at about the same time.

Yttrogummite is a variant of cleveite also found in Norway.

See also

 List of minerals
 List of minerals named after people

References

Uranium(IV) minerals
Thorium minerals
Oxide minerals